Pandhayam is a 2008 Indian Tamil-language action thriller film directed by S. A. Chandrasekhar, starring Nithin Sathya and Sindhu Tolani while Prakash Raj and Raadhika play supporting roles. Vijay did a guest role as himself. The music was composed by Vijay Antony with cinematography by Srinivas Devamsam and editing by J. N. Harsha. The film released on 19 September 2008.

Plot
Masanam (Prakash Raj), a local thug and criminal who kills people, slowly rises up the ranks to be a minister. Shakthivel (Nithin Sathya) is a die-hard fan of an actor Vijay and studies in college. He falls in love with Masanam's sister Thulasi (Sindhu Tolani) and challenges him (he has a reason for that), and a cat-and-mouse game ensues. What follows is a series of incidents between the two that leads to a melodramatic climax.

Cast

Special appearances :

Soundtrack
The soundtrack consists of five songs composed by Vijay Antony. It features remixes of the songs "Surangani" and "Chinna Maamiye".

Critical reception
Behindwoods wrote, "There is no singular theme or accent in Pandhayam and the film abounds in illogical narrations." Rediff wrote "Watch Pandhayam if you've challenged your friends about sitting through a ridiculous movie. Even then, you might end up losing."

References

External links
 

2008 films
Indian action thriller films
2000s Tamil-language films
2008 action thriller films